Goleigh Hill is one of the highest points in the county of Hampshire, England.

Goleigh Hill rises about 2.5 kilometres west of the village of Empshott in Hampshire and is one of the East Hampshire Hangers. The top of the hill is open. Wooded areas on its flanks included Goleigh and Lye Woods to the west and Abbot's Copse to the east. Goleigh Farm lies on the northwestern slope of the hill with Goleigh Manor in the valley below it. There is a trig point at the summit.

References 

Hills of Hampshire